Ordnance Gazetteer of Scotland: A Graphic and Accurate Description of Every Place in Scotland is a book by Francis Hindes Groome. It was published in 1901, by T. C. and E. C. Jack of Edinburgh, combining six volumes (titled Ordnance Gazetteer of Scotland: A Survey of Scottish Topography, Statistical, Biographical, and Historical) written between 1884 and 1885, along with initial revisions made in 1895 and subsequent smaller revisions. It has entries for all of Scotland's cities, towns, villages and hamlets, beginning with Aven in today's Aberdeenshire and concluding with Zetland, the former name of Shetland. It also includes tourist attractions, historical sites and the histories of family names and clans.

In the book's closing 130-page "general survey" chapter, its sections are written by various notable contributors:

 the country's leading physical features was written by James Geikie
 the section on the history of Scotland was written by William Melven
 the sections on the country's position, boundaries, extent and area; population; industries; its mountains, lakes, rivers and islands; and administration were written by Hugh Alexander Webster
 the section on its transport system was by Thomas Allan Croal
 the sections on fishing, deer forests and grouse moors were by James G. Bertram
 James Landells compiled the agriculture portion
 the zoology section was contributed by John Gibson
 meteorology was provided by Alexander Buchan
 geology was by Ben Peach and John Horne
 its botany section was written by Thomas King
 its section on education was written by Walter Scott Dalgleish
 Scotland's ecclesiastical history was contributed by the Rev. John Reith, B. D.
 its Scottish language and literature section was by John Merry Ross
 the Gaelic language and literature portion was by the Rev. Archibald Clerk

Subtitled a "new edition", the book includes a 1901 United Kingdom census appendix and a map of Scotland by Collins Bartholomew.

Today, the book is available in full at the A Gazetteer for Scotland website. It also appears as part of The Gazetteer for Scotland, produced by the University of Edinburgh, Scotland, and is directly searchable within "A Vision of Britain through Time".

The original six volumes were published by Thomas C. Jack, of Edinburgh, London and Glasgow. They are archived at the National Library of Scotland.

Composition 
Upon the publication of the final volume of the initial survey in 1885, geographer John Scott Keltie wrote:

References 

1901 books
History of Scotland
Books about Scotland
Gazetteers